Ahmed Reyed Mawla (born 1 February 2003), is a Qatari born-Sudanese professional footballer who plays as a midfielder for Qatar Stars League side Al-Khor.

Career
Ahmed started his career at the youth team of Al-Khor and represented the club at every level.

Career statistics

Club

Notes

References

External links
 

2003 births
Living people
Qatari footballers
Qatari people of Sudanese descent
Naturalised citizens of Qatar
Sudanese emigrants to Qatar
Association football midfielders
Al-Khor SC players
Qatar Stars League players